Yokozegawa Dam  is a gravity dam located in Kochi Prefecture in Japan. The dam is used for flood control and water supply. The catchment area of the dam is 11.4 km2. The dam impounds about 40  ha of land when full and can store 7300 thousand cubic meters of water. The construction of the dam was started on 1982 and completed in 2019.

See also
List of dams in Japan

References

Dams in Kōchi Prefecture